Sukinda Airstrip, is a private airstrip located at Sukinda in the Jajpur district of Odisha. Nearest airport to this airstrip is Savitri Jindal Airport in Angul, Odisha. It is operated by Tata Steel for emergency medical purposes.

References

Airports in Odisha
Jajpur district
Airports with year of establishment missing